The MTV World Stage VMAJ 2010 were held on Saturday, May 29, at the Yoyogi National Gymnasium in Tokyo, Japan. The nominees were announced on March 31, 2010. Lady Gaga received five nominations while Jay-Z, Alicia Keys, The Black Eyed Peas, Namie Amuro, Miliyah Kato, and Juju all received three nominations each.

Exile set a new milestone at the event, becoming the first group to receive three awards for three consecutive years. This year, they won in the categories for Video of the Year, Album of the Year, and the Asia Icon Award.

Awards 
Winners are in bold text.

Video of the Year
Exile — "Futatsu no Kuchibiru"
Namie Amuro — "Fast Car"
Ayaka — "Minna Sora no Shita"
Alicia Keys — "Doesn't Mean Anything"
Lady Gaga — "Poker Face"

Album of the Year
Exile — Aisubeki Mirai e
Namie Amuro — Past < Future
The Black Eyed Peas — The E.N.D. 
Green Day — 21st Century Breakdown
Superfly — Box Emotions

Best Male Video
Shota Shimizu — "Utsukushii Hibi yo"
Jay'ed — "Everybody"
Jay-Z featuring Alicia Keys — "Empire State of Mind" 
Kreva — "Shunkan speechless"
Sean Paul — "So Fine"

Best Female Video
Namie Amuro — "Fast Car"
Ayaka — "Minna Sora no Shita"
Kaela Kimura — "Butterfly"
Lady Gaga — "Poker Face" 
Rihanna — "Russian Roulette"

Best Group Video
Tohoshinki — "Share the World"
Backstreet Boys — "Straight Through My Heart"
The Black Eyed Peas — "I Gotta Feeling" 
Remioromen — "Kachōfūgetsu"
Tokyo Incidents — "Nōdōteki Sanpunkan"

Best New Artist
Big Bang — "Gara Gara Go!" 
Mao Abe — "Itsu no Hi mo"
Keri Hilson featuring Kanye West and Ne-Yo — "Knock You Down"
Taylor Swift — "You Belong With Me"
The Telephones — "Monkey Discooooooo"

Best Rock Video
Superfly — "Dancing on the Fire"
9mm Parabellum Bullet — "Inochi no Zenmai"
Green Day — "Know Your Enemy"
Muse — "Uprising"
Radwimps — "Oshakanshama"

Best Pop Video
Big Bang — "Koe o Kikasete"
Ikimono-gakari — "Yell"
Kumi Koda — "Lick Me"
Leona Lewis — "Happy"
Pink — "Please Don't Leave Me"

Best R&B Video
Miliyah Kato — "Aitai"
Chris Brown — "Crawl"
Jasmine — "Sad to Say"
Juju with Jay'ed — "Ashita ga Kuru Nara"
Alicia Keys — "Doesn't Mean Anything"

Best Hip-Hop Video
Kreva — "Speechless"
Eminem — "We Made You"
Flo Rida featuring Kesha — "Right Round" 
Jay-Z featuring Alicia Keys — "Empire State of Mind" 
Rhymester — "Once Again"

Best Reggae Video
Han-Kun — "Keep it Blazing"
Sean Kingston — "Fire Burning"
Sean Paul — "So Fine"
Pushim — "My Endless Love"
Ryo the Skywalker — "Kokoni Aru Ima wo Tomoni Aruki Dasou"

Best Dance Video
Lady Gaga — "Poker Face"
Cos/Mes — "Chaosexotica"
David Guetta featuring Kelly Rowland — "When Love Takes Over" 
La Roux — "I'm Not Your Toy"
Perfume — "One Room Disco"

Best Video from a Film
Juju with Jay'ed — "Ashita ga Kuru Nara" (from April Bride)
Flumpool — "Dear Mr. & Ms. Picaresque" (from MW)
Leona Lewis — "I See You" (from Avatar)
Paramore — "Decode" (from Twilight)
Shōnan no Kaze — "Tomo Yo" (from Drop)

Best Collaboration
W-inds featuring G-Dragon — "Rain Is Fallin'"
Beyoncé featuring Lady Gaga — "Video Phone" 
Jay-Z featuring Alicia Keys — "Empire State of Mind" 
Juju with Jay'ed — "Ashita ga Kuru Nara"
Miliyah Kato featuring Shota Shimizu — "Love Forever"

Best Karaokee! Song
Miliyah Kato featuring Shota Shimizu — "Love Forever" 
The Black Eyed Peas — "I Gotta Feeling"
Kaela Kimura — "Butterfly"
Lady Gaga — "Poker Face"
Kana Nishino — "Motto..."

Special awards

MTV Icon Award
Exile

Best Director
Kodama Hirokazu

Live performances
Big Bang — "Gara Gara Go!" / "Hands Up"
2NE1 — "Fire"
Bradberry Orchestra — "Love Check"
Exile — "24karats Stay Gold"
Miliyah Kato — "Sayonara Baby" / "Bye Bye"
Kesha — "Tik Tok" / "Your Love Is My Drug"
K'naan with AI — "Wavin' Flag"
Superfly — "Alright!!" / "Roll Over the Rainbow"
Taio Cruz — "Break Your Heart"
W-inds — "New World" / "Rain Is Fallin'"

Guest celebrities

Chemistry
DJ Kaori
Dream
Miho Fukuhara
Risa Hirako
Iconiq 
Jay'ed
Joy
Juliet
Tsuyoshi Kitazawa
License

Masato
May J.
Akina Minami
Minmi
Scandal
Shōnan no Kaze
Spontania
Miho Tanaka
Vanness Wu
Chinatsu Wakatsuki
Yu-A

External links
MTV Video Music Awards Japan website

2010 in Japanese music